X#, pronounced X sharp and often written XSharp, is an xBase-compatible programming language for the Microsoft .NET platform. X# has been built on top of Roslyn, the open source architecture behind the current Microsoft C# and Visual Basic .NET compilers.

The X# compiler is intended to support multiple dialects in the xBase programming language family. It supports Core, Visual Objects, Vulcan.NET, xBase++, Harbour, Foxpro and more. The project is intended as an opensource community effort, but is at the moment still partly closed source.

History
In 2015, the majority of the developers of the Vulcan.NET team started the XSharp compiler development due to conflicts with their previous employer GrafXSoft about future developments.

As a proof of concept and viability, the Vulcan IDE was recompiled and rebuilt in XSharp into XIDE.

On July 3, 2017, the first general release (version 1.0.1, Anjou) was published.
Version 2.5.1.0 was released on July 6th 2020.

The X# development team consists of former members of the Visual Objects and Vulcan.NET development teams.

Supported dialects
At the moment the following dialects are supported:
 XSharp Core language: This language lacks a native dialect runtime, which means that there are no USUAL, ARRAY and other xBase familiar datatypes. Only the native available datatypes of .NET are available.
 Vulcan.NET: The official runtime of Vulcan.NET can be used or the by XSharp provided alternative runtime.
 Visual Objects (VO)
 xHarbour
 FoxPro/Visual FoxPro

In the future, the team intends to also support the following dialects:
 XBase++

Technology
The XSharp compiler is based upon the Roslyn compiler and can make full use of the available .NET framework classes.

It integrates with all known editions of Visual Studio 2019, 2017 and 2015.

See also
 Clipper (programming language)
 Harbour (software)
 Visual FoxPro

External links
XSharp Home web site
XSharp extension for Visual Studio (Microsoft Visual Studio Marketplace
Open Source X Sharp repo source code on GitHub

Vulcan.NET Xbase language for Microsoft .NET

.NET programming languages
XBase programming language family
Query languages